International Karate +, stylized as IK+, is a fighting game written by Archer Maclean and published in 1987 by System 3 for the Commodore 64, Amstrad CPC, and ZX Spectrum. It is a successor to International Karate (1985). Activision published the Commodore 64 version in the US as Chop N' Drop.

Gameplay

Three karateka fight against each other on a beach, trying to be the first to score six points. After every two rounds, there is a bonus game which is either deflecting bouncing balls or kicking away bombs. The C64 version of the game only has the ball bouncing bonus game, and not the bomb bonus game. The game can be played by one or two human players; at least one fighter is always controlled by the computer. Unlike its predecessor, International Karate, there is only one backdrop. However, different parts of the backdrop can be recoloured to several different themes by the players using specific keystrokes. The Amiga, Atari and C64 versions of the game (and possibly other versions, unconfirmed) had a number of "background antics", a Pac-Man would appear, a spider would descend, and a U-boat's periscope would occasionally be seen in the harbour. In addition, pressing a certain key or keys would cause the trousers of all three protagonists to fall down, after which they would do a double-take. Additionally, it was possible (on the Amiga version, at least) to type in four-letter curse words; the game would respond first by rebuking the player for their use of such language, and upon the second offence would reset the game.

Development
Archer Maclean did most of the work on developing the game, and the music was written by Rob Hubbard, who created a more energetic main theme after the predecessor, but still based it on "Merry Christmas, Mr. Lawrence" by Japanese composer and actor Ryuichi Sakamoto. Music for the Amiga version was arranged by Dave Lowe. In August 2005, the music from the game was performed at the third Symphonic Game Music Concert in Leipzig, Germany.

The packaging illustration for the Activision Commodore 64 release version of IK+, entitled "Chop 'N Drop", was created by Marc Ericksen.

Ports
16-bit versions of the game were released in 1988 for the Atari ST and Amiga home computers. Apart from the music, which was arranged by Dave Lowe, the Atari ST version was created entirely by Archer Maclean. The bitmap editor NeoChrome was used to draw background graphics and sprites and the code was written in assembly language on an IBM PC-based development system that cross-compiled the 800 KBytes of source code in seven seconds and transferred the program to the RAM of the Atari ST via a parallel cable. Development took six months. The subsequent Amiga port took just seven days.

Reception

The game was voted Best 16-Bit Soundtrack of the Year at the 1988 Golden Joystick Awards.

Legacy

Another International Karate Deluxe game (AKA IK++) was ready but unreleased for the Atari ST and Amiga in 1987/1988.

It was also released by Activision in 1988 for the Commodore 64 under the title Chop 'N Drop. A version for Amiga CD32 was released in 1994.

In 2003, Maclean's Ignition Entertainment released IK+ for the Game Boy Advance and PlayStation in Europe, which remained faithful to the 16-bit iterations.

The C64 version was re-released on the Virtual Console in Europe on July 25, 2008.

References

External links

The Making of International Karate +. Edge Online, November 27, 2009. – Interview with Archer Maclean

1987 video games
Amiga games
Amstrad CPC games
Atari ST games
Amiga CD32 games
Commodore 64 games
Game Boy Advance games
Golden Joystick Award winners
Karate video games
PlayStation (console) games
Fighting games
Video game sequels
Video games scored by David Lowe
Video games scored by Rob Hubbard
Video games developed in the United Kingdom
Virtual Console games
ZX Spectrum games
UTV Ignition Games games
Multiplayer and single-player video games